The Amateur Detective is a 1914 American silent short comedy directed by Carroll Fleming for the Thanhouser Film Corporation. The film stars Carey L. Hastings, Ernest C. Warde and Muriel Ostriche.

Synopsis
Thanhouser literature describes it as "A laughable parody on Sherlock Holmes."

History and preservation status
This film represented a subgenre of detective parodies common to the era of the Nickelodeon. It is preserved in the AFI/Alfred Bruzzese collection; the surviving print is only a fragment, consisting of 240 feet of the original 990-foot running length.

References

External links
 
 Silent Era Database Entry
 American Film Cycles: The Silent Era 

1914 comedy-drama films
1914 films
American silent short films
American black-and-white films
1910s American films
Comedy-drama short films
Silent American comedy-drama films